Olivia Mathias (born 12 October 1998) is a Welsh professional triathlete. She competed at the 2022 Commonwealth Games, in Mixed relay, winning a silver medal.

She competed at the 2018 Commonwealth Games, and 2019 World Triathlon U23 World Championships.

She competed at the 2022 Europe Triathlon Cup Kitzbühel, winning a gold medal.

References 

Living people
1998 births
Welsh female triathletes
Triathletes at the 2018 Commonwealth Games
Triathletes at the 2022 Commonwealth Games
Commonwealth Games medallists in triathlon
Commonwealth Games silver medallists for Wales
Sportspeople from Newark-on-Trent
Medallists at the 2022 Commonwealth Games